Catocala flavescens is a moth of the family Erebidae first described by George Hampson in 1894. It is found in India.

References

flavescens
Moths described in 1894
Moths of Asia